The Philippine luminous roughy (Aulotrachichthys latus) is a slimehead native to the Western Pacific around Indonesia and the Philippines. It is a deep-water species, ranging from  beneath the surface.

References

Aulotrachichthys
Fish of Indonesia
Fish of the Philippines
Fish described in 1938